The July 1936 military uprising in Seville was a military uprising in Seville, Spain on 18 July 1936, which contributed to the start of the Spanish Civil War. The 17–18 July coup failed in the Andalusian cities of Malaga, Jaen and Huelva, but succeeded in Cordoba, Granada, Cadiz and in the capital city, Seville. The city's garrison, led by Queipo de Llano, occupied the city and carried out a bloody repression. In August 1936, the Nationalists started their advance towards Madrid from Seville.

Background
On 17–18 July a part of the Spanish army, led by a group of officers (among them the generals Sanjurjo, Franco, Mola, Goded and Queipo de Llano), tried to overthrow the Popular Front government of the Second Spanish Republic. One of the main goals of the coup was to take control of the main cities of the country, among them Seville. Seville was the capital city of Andalusia and the most revolutionary city of southern Spain.

Plot
Queipo de Llano, the leader of the coup in Seville, claimed that he seized Seville with a small force of 130 soldiers and 15 civilians. Also, he said that alone and gun-at-hand he had arrested the republican general Villa-Abrile and after he had convinced the entire garrison to join the rising. The coup in Seville was planned by the chief of staff of Seville, José Cuesta Moreneo who barely could gather 150 men. Most of the units were on summer leave. The commander of the Second Military Division, General Jose Villa-Abrille, was aware of the plotters' preparations, but he did nothing.

Coup
On 17 July, Queipo de Llano, who was the chief of the carabineros (the frontier police) came to Seville in a tour of inspection. In the morning of 18 July, Queipo de Llano accompanied by his ADC and three officers, entered in the office of the general Villa-Abrille and arrested him. After that he went to the San Hermenigildo barracks and detained the colonel of the 6th regiment, Manuel Allanegi, who had refused to join the rising. Then the artillery regiment also joined the rising and the rebel troops surrounded and bombed the gobierno civil (civil government), held by loyal assault guards. The civil governor (delegate of the Spanish government) surrendered after Queipo promised to save their lives, but the chief of the police and the assault guards were executed. Then the Civil Guard in Seville joined to the rebellion. The civil governor, José María Varela Rendueles, was sentenced to death by the rebels, but the sentence was reduced to 30 years' imprisonment.

A general strike was ordered by the trade unions, the workers withdrew into their own districts of Triana and La Macarena and built barricades, but they only had a few weapons. The rebel troops (4,000 men) seized the nerve centers of the city, occupying the telephone exchange, the town hall and the radio station, and establishing control routes into the center of the city. On 20 July, the rebels bombed the working-class districts of Seville, and after the rebel troops supported by the troops of the Spanish Legion arrived from Africa, 50 civil guards, 50 requetes and 50 falangists entered in the Triana and Macarena districts, using women and children as human shields, and started a bloody repression. The legionaries killed with knives all the men whom they found. On 21 July, the Castejon's V Bandera of the Spanish Legion assaulted the districts of La Macarena, San Julián, San Bernardo and El Pumarejo. By 25 July the Nationalists occupied all Seville. According to the Queipo's press assistant: "In the working-class districts, the Foreign Legion and Moroccan regulares went up and down the streets of very modest one-story houses, throwing grenades in the windows, blowing up and killing women and children. The Moors took the opportunity to loot and rape at will. General Queipo de Llano, in his night-time talks at the Radio Seville microphone...urged on his troops to rape women and recounted with crude sarcasm brutal scenes of this sort.".

Aftermath
After the coup, all persons of Republican and Left connections were rounded up by the Nationalists and imprisoned. The repression in Seville was organized by the captain Díaz Criado, who was reported as signing death sentences at a rate of 'about sixty per day'. Three thousand Republican supporters were shot in the first weeks after the coup. The Republicans had killed thirteen supporters of the Nationalists (among them seven civilians in the neighborhood of Triana) during the coup. After the coup Queipo de Llano sent mixed columns made up of Civil Guards, Falangists, requetes and soldiers, financed by wealthy landowners, in order to occupy other towns in the province. Large numbers of prisoners were sent by these columns to Seville and executed. Seville was a strategic victory for the rebels, because in August 1936, the rebel troops started their advance towards Madrid through Extremadura.

See also 

 List of Spanish Nationalist military equipment of the Spanish Civil War
 List of Spanish Republican military equipment of the Spanish Civil War

Notes

Bibliography
Beevor, Antony. (2006). The battle for Spain. The Spanish civil war, 1936-1939. Penguin Books. London. .
Espinosa, Francisco. (2006). La justicia de Queipo. Editorial Crítica. Barcelona. 
Jackson, Gabriel. (1967). The Spanish Republic and the Civil War, 1931-1939. Princeton. Princeton University Press. 
Preston, Paul. (2006). The Spanish Civil War. Reaction, revolution & revenge. Harper Perennial. London.  
Thomas, Hugh. (2001) The Spanish Civil War. Penguin Books. London.

External links
Photo of republican supporters shot in the Triana district, 21 July 1936.

Spanish Civil War
1936 in Spain
Mass murder in 1936
Conflicts in 1936
History of Seville
July 1936 events
20th century in Seville
20th-century rebellions
Mass murder in Spain